A kinase (PRKA) interacting protein 1 is a protein in humans that is encoded by the AKIP1 gene.

This gene encodes a nuclear protein that interacts with protein kinase A catalytic subunit, and regulates the effect of the cAMP-dependent protein kinase signaling pathway on the NF-kappa-B activation cascade. Alternatively spliced transcript variants have been described for this gene. [provided by RefSeq, Oct 2011].

References 

Genes on human chromosome 11